The Satellite C series was Toshiba Information Systems's budget consumer line of Satellite laptops. Screen sizes on the C series ranged between 14 and 17 in diagonally; the laptops were offered with Intel or AMD processors.

The series was introduced in late 2010 with the C655, which retailed for $398 and featured an AMD Fusion processor. The C655 was compared to the then-popular netbooks of the period in terms of having slower processors and lower-capacity hard disk drives. Early entries in the series were basic affairs with matte plastic finishes; in 2015 Toshiba began introducing C-Series Satellites with resin finishes imitating the look of stainless steel, included Skullcandy-manufactured speakers, and were optioned with touchscreen displays.

Toshiba discontinued the C series in 2016 along with the entire Satellite line of laptops.

Models

References

Satellite C series